Karin Inger Monica Nilsson (born 4 May 1959) is a Swedish actress and singer. She is a former child actress. She is primarily known for her portrayal of Pippi Longstocking in the Swedish-produced TV series of the same name during 1969 which was compiled, re-dubbed into German and later also in English and many other languages, and released as two feature films in 1969. In 1970, she reprised her role of Pippi in two subsequent feature films. As of 2005, she works as a secretary in Stockholm, occasionally taking small stage roles.

Career

Nilsson was eight years old when she was cast as Pippi Longstocking. First, she did a TV series and then four feature films. After Pippi Longstocking she trained as a medical secretary, but chose to pursue a career as an actress. Nilsson was, among other things, property master at the East Gothland Theatre and acted in several plays.

Since 2007, she has been appearing on the German TV-channel ZDF as the forensic pathologist Ewa in the TV-series Der Kommissar und das Meer.

In 2009, Nilsson was a celebrity contestant on Kändisdjungeln.

Awards
In 1975, Nilsson received a TP de Oro award in the "Most Popular Personage" category for her role in Pippi Longstocking TV series.

Filmography
 1969 - Pippi Longstocking
 1969 - Pippi Goes on Board
 1970 - Pippi in the South Seas
 1970 - Pippi on the Run
 1989 - Brenda Brave
 2000 - Gripsholm
 2015 - The Here After

Discography

Albums

Singles

References

External links

 

1959 births
Living people
People from Kinda Municipality
Swedish child actresses
Swedish film actresses
Secretaries